The Constantin Brâncoveanu University is a private university in Pitești, Romania, founded in 1991.

References 

Universities in Pitești
Educational institutions established in 1991
1991 establishments in Romania
Brăila
Râmnicu Vâlcea